Caroline County Public Schools is a public school system serving the residents of Caroline County, Maryland on Maryland's Eastern Shore.  The main administrative branch is located at 204 Franklin Street in Denton, Maryland.  The system serves approximately 5,500 students and more than 380 professional staff members.

Administration
Interim Superintendent of Schools: Dr. Derek Simmons
Assistant Superintendent of Administrative Services: Milton Nagel
Director of Student Services: vacant
Director of Curriculum and Instruction: Susan McCandless
Director of Special Programs: Elizabeth Anthony
Director of Professional Development and Assessments: Lisa Hopkins

Board of Education
President: James Newcomb, Jr.
Vice-President: Donna L. DiGiacomo
Members: Rick Barton, Arevia Michele Wayman, and vacant as of June 2021

High schools
North Caroline High School
Colonel Richardson High School
Caroline Career & Technology Center

Middle schools
Colonel Richardson Middle School
Lockerman Middle School

Elementary schools
Denton Elementary School
Federalsburg Elementary School
Greensboro Elementary School
Preston Elementary School
Ridgely Elementary School

Support Programs
Early Head Start & Family Support Center
Caroline County Judy Centers

References

External links
 
 

School districts in Maryland
Education in Caroline County, Maryland